The Party for Justice and Unity (or PDU) was a political party in Albania whose primary aim is promotion of the Cham issue.

The party was created after the 2009 parliamentary elections, in September by two deputies of the Albanian parliament: the sole representative of Party for Justice and Integration, Dashamir Tahiri and Shpëtim Idrizi, a Cham MP of the Socialist Party.

On 17 February 2011 it merged with the Party for Justice and Integration to form the Party for Justice, Integration and Unity.

References

External links
 

Defunct political parties in Albania
Political parties established in 2009
2009 establishments in Albania
Political parties disestablished in 2011
2011 disestablishments in Albania
Cham Albanians